Metlaouia is a genus of moths of the family Noctuidae. Its distinctness from Cucullia is disputed.

Species include:
 Metlaouia autumna

References
 Metlaouia at funet.fi
 Natural History Museum Lepidoptera genus database

Cuculliinae